Wang Aiping may refer to:

 Wang Aiping (baseball) (born 1972), China national baseball team coach
 Wang Aiping (physician) (born 1958), Chinese pharmacologist and toxicologist